Ship Creek (Dena'ina: Dgheyaytnu) is an Alaskan river that flows from the Chugach Mountains into Cook Inlet. The Port of Anchorage at the mouth of Ship Creek gave its name ("Knik Anchorage") to the city of Anchorage that grew up nearby.

The river lies entirely within the limits of the Municipality of Anchorage, Alaska.  Most of its upper length traverses Joint Base Elmendorf-Richardson.

History
The Dena'ina language name for the creek is Dgheyaytnu. In early 1915, a tent city formed at the mouth of Ship Creek for workers involved in the construction of the Alaska Railroad. This disorganized community was soon relocated south to the bluffs along the creek, forming what would become the early town of Anchorage. In July 1923, President Warren G. Harding arrived at the Ship Creek rail station during his tour of the state to celebrate the completion of the Alaska Railroad and deliver several speeches in Anchorage.

Recreation
Ship Creek is a popular area for sport fishing and is considered the only urban king salmon fishery in the world. It has an annual run of Coho and Chinook salmon and regularly hosts a salmon derby.

Watershed and Hydrology
Ship Creek's headwaters begin high in the Chugach Mountains at Ship Lake. After a swift descent over mountain bedrock, the creek flows along a sloping glacial outwash plain composed of relatively permeable coarse-grained alluvial deposits as it approaches Knik Arm.

The streamflow of Ship Creek has been measured by the USGS since 1946.

See also
 Chester Creek (Alaska)
 Campbell Creek (Alaska)
 List of Alaska rivers

References

Rivers of Anchorage, Alaska
Rivers of Alaska